Arthur Denny (29 April 1704 - 8 August 1742) was an Irish politician.

He was educated at Trinity College, Dublin.

Denny was a Member of Parliament for Kerry in the Irish House of Commons from 1727 until his death in 1742.

References

1704 births
1742 deaths
Irish MPs 1727–1760
Members of the Parliament of Ireland (pre-1801) for County Kerry constituencies
Alumni of Trinity College Dublin